Khaneqah Kandi (also Romanized as Khāneqāh Kandī; also known as Khāneqāh and Khānqā) is a village in Mulan Rural District, in the Central District of Kaleybar County, East Azerbaijan Province, Iran. At the 2006 census, its population was 14, in 5 families.

References 

Populated places in Kaleybar County